Adolf Gustav Schlabitz (7 June 1854 – 4 September 1943) was a German portrait and genre painter.

Life and work 
He was born in Groß Wartenberg as the second child of a soap maker. From 1875 to 1882, he was enrolled at the Prussian Academy of Arts, where he studied with Paul Thumann, Otto Knille, Karl Gussow and Ernst Hildebrand, among others. With the help of a scholarship, awarded for his painting of a trial in the Breslau District Court, he was able to continue his studies at the Académie Julian in Paris, with Jules-Joseph Lefebvre and Gustave Boulanger. This was followed by study trips to several locations in Europe and the United States.

Upon returning to Germany, he lived in Munich for three years, then opened a private art school in Berlin. By 1901, he was able to afford a house in Brixlegg, which he used as a summer retreat.

At that time, he took a position as assistant in the drawing classes of Ernst Hancke (1834–1914), at what is now the Berlin University of the Arts. In 1911, at the request of Anton von Werner, he was named a Professor. During the course of his teaching career, which lasted until 1918, he had several students who would become notable, such as Lyonel Feininger, Albert Windisch,  and August Brömse. In addition to his painting, he was an avid collector of folk art.
 
In 1921, he retired and took up permanent residence at his house in Brixlegg. At eighty-one, he was its oldest member. He died at his home in 1943, aged eighty-nine, and was interred in Groß Wartenberg.

References

Further reading 
 "Schlabitz, Adolf", In: Friedrich von Boetticher: Malerwerke des 19. Jahrhunderts. Beitrag zur Kunstgeschichte, Vol.2/2, Saal–Zwengauer, Boetticher’s Verlag, Dresden 1901, pp. 573–574 (Online)
 "Schlabitz, Adolf", In: Allgemeines Lexikon der Bildenden Künstler von der Antike bis zur Gegenwart, Vol. 30: Scheffel–Siemerding, E. A. Seemann, Leipzig 1936
 "Schlabitz, Adolf". In: Hans Vollmer (Ed.): Allgemeines Lexikon der bildenden Künstler des XX. Jahrhunderts, Vol.4: Q–U, pg.189,  E. A. Seemann, Leipzig 1958
 Hans-Joachim Danzmann: "Adolf Schlabitz – ein Künstlerporträt", in: Nordsächsische Rundschau, 4 September 1993

External links 

 More works by Schlabitz @ ArtNet

1854 births
1943 deaths
19th-century German painters
19th-century German male artists
German genre painters
Prussian Academy of Arts alumni
Academic staff of the Technical University of Berlin
People from Syców
20th-century German painters
20th-century German male artists